Tata Power Company Limited is an Indian electric utility company based in Mumbai, Maharashtra, India and is part of the Tata Group. The core business of the company is to generate, transmit and distribute electricity. With an installed electricity generation capacity of 14,076MW, it is India's largest integrated power company. Tata Power has been ranked 3rd in 2017 Responsible Business Rankings  developed by IIM Udaipur. In February 2017, Tata Power became the first Indian company to ship over 1 GW solar modules.

History 

The firm started as the Tata Hydroelectric Power Supply Company in 1910, which amalgamated with the Andhra Valley Power Supply Company in 1916. It commissioned India's Second hydro-electric project in 1915 in Khopoli for 72 MW. Then second and third power plants were installed in Bhivpuri (75 MW) in 1919 and Bhira (300 MW) in 1922.

Operations 
Tata Power has operations in India, Singapore, Indonesia, South Africa and Bhutan. Tata Power Group has its operations based in 35 locations in India.The thermal power stations of the company are located at Trombay in Mumbai, Mundra in Gujarat, Jojobera and Maithon in Jharkhand, Kalinganagar in Odisha, Haldia in West Bengal and Belgaum in Karnataka. The hydro stations are located in the Western Ghats of Maharashtra and the wind farms in Ahmednagar, Supa, Khanke, Brahmanwel, Gadag, Samana and Visapur. The company installed India's first 500 MW unit at Trombay, the first 150 MW pumped storage unit at Bhira, and a flue gas desulphurization plant for pollution control at Trombay. It has generation capacities in the States of Jharkhand and Karnataka, and a distribution company in Delhi, servicing over one million consumers spread over 510 square km in the North Delhi. The peak load in this area is about 1,150 MW. Tata Power announced on 24 July 2012, commissioning of the second unit of 525 MW capacity of the Maithon mega thermal project in Dhanbad. The first unit of identical capacity was commissioned in September 2011.

It also has a distribution company in Ajmer.And also produces 160 MW of solar energy under its subsidiary Tata Power Solar at Jetstar, Rajasthan.

Major power plants 
 Mundra Ultra Mega Power Plant. A 4,000 MW (5×800 MW) coal-based thermal power plant at Mundra, Kutch district, Gujarat. This plant is fully functional.
 Trombay Thermal Power Station. A 1,580 MW thermal power plant at Trombay, near Mumbai, Maharashtra. This plant is fully functional.
 Maithon Power Plant. A 1,050 MW (2×525 MW) coal-based thermal power plant at Maithon, Dhanbad, Dhanbad district, Jharkhand. This plant is fully functional. This power plant is owned by Maithon Power Limited a 74:26 joint venture between Tata Power and Damodar Valley Corporation.
 Jojobera Power Plant. A 427.5 MW (67.5 MW and 3×120 MW) coal-based thermal power plant at Jojobera in Jamshedpur, East Singhbhum district, Jharkhand. This plant is fully functional.

International operations 
The company has executed overseas projects in the Middle East, Africa and South East Asia including the Jebel Ali 'G' station (4×100 MW + desalination plant) in Dubai, Al-Khobar II (5×150 MW + desalination plant) and Jeddah III (4×64 MW + desalination plant) in Saudi Arabia, Shuwaikh (5×50 MW) in Kuwait, EHV substations in UAE and Algeria, and power plant operation and maintenance contracts in Iran and Saudi Arabia.

Tata Power has a Russian subsidiary, Far Eastern Natural Resources LLC, that has a license for a coal mine in Kamchatka Krai.

Strategic Engineering Division 
The firm's Strategic Engineering Division (SED) has engaged in defence systems and engineering for over four decades. It works with the MoD and laboratories to provide products and solutions for the defence requirements of the country.

It has already cleared the Joint Receipt Inspection (JRI) for the first two lots of Pinaka launchers and command posts; the third and fourth lots have successfully undergone factory acceptance tests. Tata Power's Strategic Electronics Division won a tightly contested  1,000-crore contract for modernising 30 Indian Air Force airbases.

In Nov 2020, Tata Powers announced the completion of sale of Strategic Engineering Division (SED) to Tata Advanced Systems, a wholly-owned subsidiary of Tata Sons.

Problems 
In cause of dramatically higher coal prices as assumed in the plannings and a fixed price arrangement the Mundra plant in 2012 made big losses. After three successive years of losses as a result, cash flow was becoming an issue for the company. In January 2014 the company sold a 30 percent stake in Indonesian coal company PT Arutmin for $500 million. In July 2014 it signed an option to sell a 5 percent stake in Indonesian coal company Kaltim Prima Coal for $250 million.

Future projects 
Tata Power has a 51:49 joint venture with PowerGrid Corporation of India for the  Tata transmission project, India's first transmission project executed with public-private partnership financing.

Tata Power has plans to expand generation capacity of 4,000 MW Mundra plant, the country's first operational ultra mega power project, to 5,600 MW.

The company also has a 74:26 joint venture with Damodar Valley Corporation for 1,050 MW coal-based thermal power plant at Maithon in Dhanbad district of Jharkhand, named as Maithon Power Limited. Both units were commissioned on 24 July 2012. It has another 74:26 joint venture with Tata Steel Limited for thermal power plants to meet the captive requirements of Tata Steel, under name Industrial Energy Limited.

Tata Power has announced its partnership with Sunengy an Australian firm to build India's first floating solar plant based on Liquid Solar Array technology.

In 2016, Tata Power made significant inroads into the renewable energy market in India by means of its acquisition of Welspun Renewables, for a record price of $1.3 billion, the largest acquisition in the Indian renewables sector.

Tata Power bagged a 25-year licence for distribution and retail supply of electricity in Odisha's five circles, together constituting Central Electricity Supply Utility of Odisha (CESU) for about Rs 175 crore.

Shareholding 
As on 15 November 2017, Tata Group held 32.47% shares in Tata Power. Around 210,000 individual shareholders hold approx. 14% of its shares. Life Insurance Corporation of India is the largest non-promoter shareholder in the company with 12.90% shareholding.
 

The equity shares of Tata Power are listed on the Bombay Stock Exchange, where it is a constituent of the BSE SENSEX index, and the National Stock Exchange of India, where it is a constituent of the NIFTY 50.Its Global Depository Receipts (GDRs) are listed on the London Stock Exchange and the Luxembourg Stock Exchange.

Awards and recognition
 Tata Power's Singapore-based subsidiary Trust Energy Resources was conferred the 'International Maritime Awards 2013' by the Singapore Government. The award grants the company tax exemption for shipping operations, besides incentives.
 Tata Power won two awards at the Power Line Award 2013: Best Performing Private Discom' award for its Delhi distribution arm Tata Power Delhi Distribution Limited and Runners up award for 'Best Performing Renewable Company'.
 Trombay Thermal Power Station received Greentech Safety Award 2011 in the gold category (in thermal power sector) for Safety Management.
 In 2011, Tata Power was conferred the BML Munjal award for excellence in learning and development for the year 2011. Tata Power won the award in private sector category.

See also 
 Kundali River – Kundli Pumped Storage Plan
 Solar power in India
 Maharashtra Electricity Regulatory Commission
 Tata Power Delhi Distribution

References

External links 
 
 Tata Power at SourceWatch

Companies based in Mumbai
Tata Sons subsidiaries
Electric power companies of India
Energy in Maharashtra
Energy companies established in 1910
Indian companies established in 1910
Tata Power
Companies listed on the National Stock Exchange of India
Companies listed on the Bombay Stock Exchange
Indian companies established in 1919

sv:Tata (konglomerat)#Energi